Oh Boy!   is a 1991 Dutch comedy film directed by Orlow Seunke.

Cast
Orlow Seunke	... 	Boy / Pim
Kees van Kooten	... 	Bozz / Gert
Monique Smets	... 	Gal / Chloe
Steffen Kroon	... 	Sonny
Jim van der Woude	... 	Wheelchairman
Pier van Brakel	... 	Boer
Huub Stapel	... 	Jongen in Sportcafe
Peer Mascini	... 	Director
Tom Jansen	... 	Producer
Marc Didden	... 	Cameraman
Job van As	... 	Cameraman
Ingrid van Alphen	... 	Scriptgirl
Willy van der Griendt	... 	Grimeuse / Stoot
Flip Filz	... 	Opnameleider
Bart Witteveen	... 	Rekwisiteur

External links 
 

1991 films
1990s Dutch-language films
1991 comedy films
Dutch comedy films